Elatobia is a genus of moths belonging to the family Tineidae.

Species
 Elatobia bugrai Koçak, 1981
 Elatobia carbonella (Dietz, 1905)
 Elatobia deltophracta Meyrick, 1926
 Elatobia fuliginosella (Lienig & Zeller, 1846)
 Elatobia kostjuki Zagulajev, 1994
 Elatobia montelliella (Schantz, 1951)
 Elatobia ussurica Zagulajev, 1990

References

Tineinae